Sfeir is a Maronite surname from Lebanon. Notable people with the surname include:
 Alfredo Sfeir (born 1947), Chilean economist, spiritual leader and healer
 Andree Sfeir-Semler (born 1953), art historian and gallery owner
 Antoine Sfeir (1948–2018), Franco-Lebanese journalist and professor
 Dahd Sfeir (1932–2015), Uruguayan actress
 Jacqueline Sfeir (1956–2013), Palestinian educator and academic
 Mauricio González Sfeir (born 1956), Bolivian petroleum company executive and soccer promoter
 Nasrallah Boutros Sfeir (1920–2019), cardinal and patriarch of the Maronite Church
 Salim Sfeir (born 1944), Lebanese – Swiss banker and financier
 Samir Sfeir (born 1961), Lebanese composer and record producer

Arabic-language surnames